Hinglish, a portmanteau of Hindi and English, is the macaronic hybrid use of English and languages of the Indian subcontinent, and especially Hindustani. It involves code-switching or translanguaging between these languages whereby they are freely interchanged within a sentence or between sentences. Hinglish can also refer to Romanized Hindi: Hindi written in Latin script (instead of the traditional Devanagari), often also mixed with English words or phrases.

The word Hinglish was first recorded in 1967. Other colloquial portmanteau words for Hindi-influenced English include: Hindish (recorded from 1972), Hindlish (1985), Henglish (1993) and Hinlish (2013).

While the name is based on the Hindi language, it does not refer exclusively to Hindi, but "is used in India, with English words blending with Punjabi, Gujarati, Marathi and Hindi, and also in British Asian families to enliven standard English". When Hindi–Urdu is viewed as a single spoken language called Hindustani, the portmanteaus Hinglish and Urdish mean the same code-mixed tongue, where the former term is used predominantly in modern India and the latter term predominantly in Pakistan (although Urdish is a term that was relatively recently coined).

History and evolution
Hindi has an approximately ten-century history. In this period, it has accommodated several linguistic influences. Contact with Sanskrit, Persian, Arabic and Turkic languages has led to historical 'mixes' or fusions, e.g., Hindustani, Rekhta. Linguistic fusions were celebrated by Bhakti poets, in approximately the 15th-17th centuries as 'khichdi boli' – or amalgamated speech.

At the turn of the 18th century, with the rising dominion of the East India Company, also called 'Company Raj' (literally, 'Company Rule'), the languages of India were brought into contact with the foreign element of English. In colonized India, English became a symbol of authority and a powerful hegemonic tool to propagate British culture, including Christianity. The political ascendancy of the British reflected into social and professional roles; this meant that the legal system, as well as the studies in medicine and science, were conducted in English.

This led to an interest in the promotion of English into the society of Indian natives. Educated Indians, or 'brown sahibs', wished to participate in academia and pursue professional careers. Raja Rammohan Roy, a social and education reformer, advocated that English be taught to Indians by certain British gentlemen for the benefit and instruction of the native Indians. Charles Grant, the president of the East India Company's board of control, championed the cause of English education as a 'cure for darkness' where 'darkness' was 'Hindoo ignorance'. The Charter Act was passed in 1813. This legalized missionary work by the Company, including the introduction of English education. By the beginning of the twentieth century, English had become the unifying language in the Indian struggle for independence against the British.

Meanwhile, English was on its way to becoming the first global lingua franca. By the end of the twentieth century, it had special status in seventy countries, including India. Worldwide, English began to represent modernization and internationalization, with more and more jobs requiring basic fluency in it. In India especially, the language came to acquire a social prestige, 'a class apart of education', which prompted native Indian or South Asian speakers to turn bilingual, speaking their mother tongue at home or in a local context, but English in academic or work environments.

In the late 19th century, Bharatendu Harishchandra, often considered the father of modern Hindi, wrote poems in Hinglish, combining languages and scripts.

The contact of 'South Asian' languages, which is a category that refers inclusively to Hindi and Indian languages, with English, led to the emergence of the linguistic phenomenon now known as Hinglish. Many common Indic words such as 'pyjamas', 'karma', 'guru' and 'yoga' were incorporated into English usage, and vice versa ('road', 'sweater', and 'plate'). This is in parallel with several other similar hybrids around the world, like Spanglish (Spanish + English) and Taglish (Tagalog + English). A fair share of the words borrowed into English from Indian languages were themselves borrowed from Persian or Arabic. An example of this is the widely used English word 'pyjamas' which originates from Persian paejamah, literally "leg clothing," from pae "leg" (from PIE root *ped- "foot") + jamah "clothing, garment." 

In recent years, due to an increase in literacy and connectivity, the interchange of languages has reached new heights, especially due to increasing online immersion. English is the most widely used language on the internet, and this is a further impetus to the use of Hinglish online by native Hindi speakers, especially among the youth. Google's Gboard mobile keyboard app gives an option of Hinglish as a typing language where one can type a Hindi sentence in the Roman script and suggestions will be Hindi words but in the Roman script. In 2021, Google rolled out supported for Romanized Hindi on its search engine and on the Google Pay app. Phrases such as "Naya Payment" for "New Payment" and "Transaction History Dekhein" for "See Transaction History" are used. 

While Hinglish has arisen from the presence of English in India, it is not merely Hindi and English spoken side by side, but a language type in itself, like all linguistic fusions. Aside from the borrowing of vocabulary, there is the phenomenon of switching between languages, called code-switching and code-mixing, direct translations, adapting certain words, and infusing the flavours of each language into each other.

The Indian English variety, or simply Hinglish, is the Indian adaption of English in a very endocentric manner, which is why it is popular among the youth. Like other dynamic language mixes, Hinglish is now thought to 'have a life of its own'.

Hinglish used to be limited to informal contexts and ads, but it is now also used in university classrooms.

Computational analysis
With its widespread use in social media such as blogs, Facebook and Twitter, the analysis of Hinglish using computers has become important in a number of natural language processing applications like machine translation (MT) and speech-to-speech translation.

Dictionary
A dictionary using the term Hinglish in its title has been published. It describes words from Indian languages that are commonly used in urban Britain.

Users
Hinglish is more commonly heard in urban and semi-urban centers of northern India and is spoken by the Indian diaspora. Research into the linguistic dynamics of India shows that while the use of English is on the rise, there are more people fluent in Hinglish than in pure English. David Crystal, a British linguist at the University of Wales, projected in 2004 that at about 350 million, the world's Hinglish speakers may soon outnumber native English speakers.

In India, Romanized Hindi is the dominant form of expression online. In an analysis of YouTube comments, Palakodety et al., identified that 52% of comments were in Romanized Hindi, 46% in English, and 1% in Devanagari Hindi. Romanized Hindi is also used by some newspapers such as The Times of India. The first novel written in Romanized Hindi, All We Need Is Love, was published in 2015.

See also

 Creole language
 Hobson-Jobson
 Translanguaging

References

Further reading

External links

 

Hindi
Macaronic forms of English
Indian English